Alexander Duchart (3 May 1933 – 14 December 2022) was a Scottish footballer who played as a left winger for Hibernian, Third Lanark, Southend United, East Fife, Dumbarton and Falkirk before transferring into the English Southern League (Non-League) at that time to Yiewsley F.C. Having spent only a few months at Yiewsley, Duchart transferred back to Scotland to Brechin City. From Brechin, he finished his career by moving into the Highland Football League with Inverness Caledonian.

Duchart died on 14 December 2022, at the age of 89.

References

External links

1933 births
2022 deaths
Footballers from Falkirk
Scottish footballers
Association football wingers
Scottish Junior Football Association players
Scottish Football League players
Southern Football League players
Highland Football League players
English Football League players
Petershill F.C. players
Hibernian F.C. players
Third Lanark A.C. players
Southend United F.C. players
East Fife F.C. players
Dumbarton F.C. players
Falkirk F.C. players
Caledonian F.C. players
Hillingdon Borough F.C. players